Mohamed Rachid Benhadj (born 12 July 1949) is an Algerian film director and screenwriter.

Life and career 
Born in Algiers, Benhadj studied architecture and cinema at the University of Paris. He made his professional debut working for the Radiodiffusion Télévision Algérienne as a documentarist. His feature film debut Louss (aka Desert Rose, 1989) received wide critical acclaim.  In the 1990s he decided to settle permanently in Italy. Starting from his second film Touchia his films become more socially and politically committed.  He is also a painter.

Filmography 

 Louss (1988)
 Touchia (1992)
 L'ultima cena (1995)
 Mirka (2000)
 For Bread Alone (2006)
 Parfumes of Algiers (2012)
 The Star of Algiers (2016)
 Matarès (2019)

References

External links 
 

1949 births
Living people
People from Algiers 
Algerian film directors
Algerian screenwriters
University of Paris alumni